Boulder Dash: Rocks! is an action video game by German studio 10tacle released for Nintendo DS in the PAL region. The game is a part of the Boulder Dash video game series.

Plot
The protagonist, Rockford, is collecting diamonds from a variety of themed worlds to win the heart of his girlfriend, Crystal. Tentacle, a giant octopus-like creature, is also hunting for the crystals and aims to get them before Rockford.

Gameplay
The core gameplay is based on the 1984 original game. However, there are a number of new additions, including a ray gun with various powers and boss battles against Tentacle, which require a different strategy to regular levels. There are also new game modes.

References

External links
 GameSpot Summary

2007 video games
Action video games
BlackBerry games
Java platform games
Nintendo DS games
IOS games
Cancelled PlayStation Portable games
Video games developed in Germany
10tacle Studios games